"Mississippi Queen" is a song by the American rock band Mountain. Considered a rock classic, it was their most successful single, reaching number 21 in the Billboard Hot 100 in 1970. The song is included on the group's debut album and several live recordings have been issued.

Composition and recording
Drummer Corky Laing explained that he had developed some of the lyrics and the drum part prior to his joining the band. Later, when guitarist Leslie West was looking for lyrics for a guitar part he had written, Laing pulled out "The Queen" and the two worked out the song together; bassist/producer Felix Pappalardi and lyricist David Rea also received songwriting credits.  

"Mississippi Queen" was recorded during the sessions for Mountain's 1970 debut album Climbing!, but without keyboard player Steve Knight. Pappalardi provided the piano part and during the recording, he insisted on numerous takes.  Growing weary, Laing started using the cowbell to count off the song; Pappalardi liked it so much he left it in the mix, creating the song's recognizable intro.

Legacy
"Mississippi Queen" appears at number 10 on a 1995 chronological list of the "50 Heaviest Riffs of All Time" by Guitar magazine editorial staff. Author Scott R. Benarde describes the song as "an enduring anthem" with a "guitar riff that sounded like a carnivore choking on dinner". The song is ranked 230th in The Top 500 Heavy Metal Songs of All Time by biographer Martin Popoff; it also appears at number 10 on the Ultimate Classic Rock 2011 list of the "Top 10 Southern Rock Songs". Spin magazine described it as "the cowbell jam to end all cowbell jams. Mountain are to the cowbell what Dostoevsky is to the Russian novel" in naming it number one on its 2004 list of the "Fifteen Greatest Cowbell Songs of All Time".

Ozzy Osbourne recorded "Mississippi Queen" for his 2005 album Under Cover, with a guest appearance by West on guitar. The song reached number 10 on the Billboard Mainstream Rock chart.

References

External links

1970 songs
Mountain (band) songs
2005 singles
Ozzy Osbourne songs
Songs written by Felix Pappalardi
Songs written by Leslie West
Song recordings produced by Felix Pappalardi